This is a list of women writers who were born in Egypt or whose writings are closely associated with that country.

A
Aisha Abd al-Rahman (1913–1998), novelist, biographer, critic, educator
Radwa Ashour (1946–2014), novelist
Lina Attalah (active since 2004), journalist, newspaper editor
Celine Axelos (1902–1992), poet, columnist

B
Hala El Badry (born 1954), journalist, novelist
Salwa Bakr (born 1949), critic, novelist, translator
Rehab Bassam (born 1977), published blogger

E
Soheir El-Calamawy (1911–1997), short story writer, literary critic, novelist
Mansoura Ez-Eldin (born 1976), novelist, journalist

F
Ikhlas Fakhri (born 1940), poet and academic
Safaa Fathy (born 1958), poet, filmmaker, playwright, essayist

H
Amira Hanafi (born 1979), American/Egyptian poet and artist active in electronic literature

K
Jacqueline Kahanoff (1917–1979), novelist, essayist, journalist

M
Mother Irini (1936–2006), abbess, religious writer

N
Saiza Nabarawi (1897–1985), journalist, newspaper editor, feminist
Iris Nazmy (died 2018), writer, journalist, film critic
Amira Nowaira (active since the 1990s), educator, translator, non-fiction writer

R
Marwa Rakha (born 1978), relationship and dating writer
Somaya Ramadan (born 1951), short story writer, novelist, translator, educator
Alifa Rifaat (1930–1996), short story writer, novelist
Nawal El Saadawi (1931–2021), feminist writer, novelist, playwright, psychiatrist

T
Miral al-Tahawy (active since 1995), novelist, short story writer
Galila Tamarhan (died 1863), early female contributor to medical journals
Aisha Taymur (1840–1902), poet, novelist, feminist
May Telmissany (born 1965), Egyptian-Canadian novelist, translator, film critic, educator
Munira Thabit (1902–1967), journalist, non-fiction writer, memoirist

Y
Rose al Yusuf (1898–1958), actress, journalist

Z
Amina Zaydan (born 1966), novelist, short story writer

-
Egyptian women writers, List of
Writers
Women writers, List of Egyptian